"Anywhere" is the second single by Axle Whitehead, from his debut album Losing Sleep.

Track listing

Charts

Release history

References 

Axle Whitehead songs
2008 singles
Songs written by Robert Conley (music producer)
2008 songs
Sony BMG singles
Songs written by James Bryan McCollum